The 1st Wyoming Territorial Legislature was a meeting of the Wyoming Legislature that lasted from October 12 to December 10, 1869. This was the first meeting of the territorial legislature following the creation of the Wyoming Territory by the United States Congress.

History

Creation

On July 25, 1868, the United States Congress approved the Wyoming Organic Act which created the Wyoming Territory with land from the Dakota, Utah, and Idaho territories. At the time of the territory's formation there were four counties; Albany, Carbon, Carter, and Laramie counties. On September 2, 1869, the first legislature elections were held where the Democratic Party won all of the seats in the Council and House of Representatives.

Formation

The first session of the Wyoming territorial legislature occurred from October 12, to December 10, 1869. The upper house Council met in the Thomas McLeland Building and the House of Representatives met in the Arcade Building in Cheyenne, Wyoming. On October 12, John H. Howe, Chief Justice of the Wyoming Supreme Court, inaugurated the twenty-one members of the territorial legislature.

William H. Bright was selected to serve as the President of the Council and S. M. Curran was selected to serve as the Speaker of the House of Representatives. The Council convened with two members missing, W. S. Rockwell and George Wilson Jr., who would later arrive on October 15 and October 27. The House of Representatives convened with five members missing, with four of them arriving by November 23, but Representative J. M. Freeman never arrived.

Legislation

During the legislative session legislation giving women the right to vote was introduced by William Bright in the Council. On December 6, 1869, Council voted seven to two in favor and the House of Representatives voted seven to four in favor. On December 10, Governor John Allen Campbell signed the legislation into law. Amalia Post, a leader in the woman suffrage movement, was largely instrumental in having the franchise granted women in Wyoming Territory by the 1st Wyoming Territorial Legislature.

The legislature passed legislation renaming Carter County to Sweetwater and created Uinta County.

Membership

Council

Members of the Wyoming Council

House of Representatives

Members of the Wyoming House of Representatives

References

Notes

Wyoming legislative sessions